Sphenomorphus necopinatus  is a species of skink. It is endemic to the island of Java, Indonesia.

Two subspecies are recognized:

References

necopinatus
Reptiles of Indonesia
Endemic fauna of Java
Reptiles described in 1942
Taxa named by Leo Brongersma
Fauna of Java